Stillingia aquatica, known as water toothleaf and corkwood, is a flowering shrub in the genus Stillingia that grows in the Southeastern United States in parts of Georgia, Florida, Alabama, and South Carolina. It is in the spurge family, Euphorbiaceae. Stillingia aquatica was described by Alvan Wentworth Chapman in 1860.

References

aquatica
Plants described in 1860
Flora of Georgia (U.S. state)
Flora of Florida
Flora of Alabama
Flora of South Carolina
Taxa named by Alvan Wentworth Chapman